James or Jim Bowman may refer to:

 James Bowman (Canadian politician) (1861–1940), politician and farmer
 James Bowman (musician) (born 1980), American musician, lead guitarist of Against Me!
 James Bowman (countertenor) (born 1941), British singer
 James Bowman (painter) (1793–1842), American portraitist
 James Bowman (surgeon) (1784–1846), Australian surgeon and politician
 James Bowman Lindsay (1799–1862), Scottish inventor and author
 James Cloyd Bowman (1880–1961), American teacher and author
 James E. Bowman (1923–2011), American physician and academic
 James F. Bowman (1849–1899), American journalist and Bohemian Club founder
 James Langstaff Bowman (1879–1951), Canadian politician
 Jim Bowman (trade unionist) (1898–1978), British trade unionist
 Jim Bowman (American football), American football defensive back